Otto Weber may refer to:
Otto Weber (painter) (1832–1888), German painter
Otto Weber (politician), Romanian politician
Otto Weber (theologian), German theologian